The 1999 IGA SuperThrift Classic doubles was the doubles event of the fourteenth edition of the IGA SuperThrift Classic; a WTA Tier III tournament held in Oklahoma City, United States. Serena Williams and Venus Williams were the defending champions but did not compete that year.

Lisa Raymond and Rennae Stubbs won in the final 6–3, 6–4 against Amanda Coetzer and Jessica Steck.

Seeds

Draw

Qualifying

Seeds

Qualifiers
 ''' Annabel Ellwood /  Brie Rippner

Qualifying draw

External links
 1999 IGA SuperThrift Classic Doubles Draw

U.S. National Indoor Championships
IGA SuperThrift Classic